This is a list of operating systems. Computer operating systems can be categorized by technology, ownership, licensing, working state, usage, and by many other characteristics. In practice, many of these groupings may overlap. Criteria for inclusion is notability, as shown either through an existing Wikipedia article or citation to a reliable source.

Proprietary

Acorn Computers
 Arthur
 ARX
 MOS
 RISC iX
 RISC OS

Amazon
 Fire OS

Amiga Inc.
 AmigaOS
 AmigaOS 1.0-3.9 (Motorola 68000)
 AmigaOS 4 (PowerPC)
 Amiga Unix (a.k.a. Amix)

Amstrad
 AMSDOS
 Contiki
 CP/M 2.2
 CP/M Plus
 SymbOS

Apple Inc.
 Apple II family
 Apple DOS
 Apple Pascal
 ProDOS
 GS/OS
 GNO/ME
 Contiki
 Apple III
 Apple SOS
 Apple Lisa
 Apple Macintosh
 Classic Mac OS
 A/UX (UNIX System V with BSD extensions)
 Copland
 MkLinux
 Pink
 Rhapsody
 macOS (formerly Mac OS X and OS X)
 macOS Server (formerly Mac OS X Server and OS X Server)
 Apple Network Server
 IBM AIX (Apple-customized)
 Apple MessagePad
 Newton OS
 iPhone and iPod Touch
 iOS (formerly iPhone OS)
 iPad
 iPadOS
 Apple Watch
 watchOS
 Apple TV
 tvOS
 Embedded operating systems
 A/ROSE
 bridgeOS
 iPod software (unnamed embedded OS for iPod)
 Unnamed NetBSD variant for Airport Extreme and Time Capsule

Apollo Computer, Hewlett-Packard
 Domain/OS – One of the first network-based systems. Run on Apollo/Domain hardware. Later bought by Hewlett-Packard.

Atari
 Atari DOS (for 8-bit computers)
 Atari TOS
 Atari MultiTOS
 Contiki (for 8-bit, ST, Portfolio)

BAE Systems
 XTS-400

Be Inc.
 BeOS
 BeIA
 BeOS r5.1d0
 magnussoft ZETA (based on BeOS r5.1d0 source code, developed by yellowTAB)

Bell Labs
 Unix ("Ken's new system," for its creator (Ken Thompson), officially Unics and then Unix, the prototypic operating system created in Bell Labs in 1969 that formed the basis for the Unix family of operating systems)
 UNIX Time-Sharing System v1
 UNIX Time-Sharing System v2
 UNIX Time-Sharing System v3
 UNIX Time-Sharing System v4
 UNIX Time-Sharing System v5
 UNIX Time-Sharing System v6
 MINI-UNIX
 PWB/UNIX
 USG
 CB Unix
 UNIX Time-Sharing System v7 (It is from Version 7 Unix (and, to an extent, its descendants listed below) that almost all Unix-based and Unix-like operating systems descend.)
 Unix System III
 Unix System IV
 Unix System V
 Unix System V Releases 2.0, 3.0, 3.2, 4.0, and 4.2
 UNIX Time-Sharing System v8
 UNIX Time-Sharing System v9
 UNIX Time-Sharing System v10

Non-Unix Operating Systems:
 BESYS
 Plan 9 from Bell Labs
 Inferno

Burroughs Corporation, Unisys
 Burroughs MCP

Commodore International
 GEOS
 AmigaOS
 AROS Research Operating System

Control Data Corporation

Lower 3000 series
 SCOPE (Supervisory Control Of Program Execution)

Upper 3000 series
 SCOPE (Supervisory Control Of Program Execution)
 Drum SCOPE

6x00 and related Cyber
 Chippewa Operating System (COS)
 MACE (Mansfield and Cahlander Executive)
 Kronos (Kronographic OS)
 NOS (Network Operating System)
 NOS/VE NOS Virtual Environment
 SCOPE (Supervisory Control Of Program Execution)
 NOS/BE NOS Batch Environment
 SIPROS (Simultaneous Processing Operating System)

CloudMosa
 Puffin OS

Convergent Technologies
 Convergent Technologies Operating System (CTOS) – later acquired by Unisys

Cromemco
 Cromemco DOS (CDOS) – a Disk Operating system compatible with CP/M
 Cromix – a multitasking, multi-user, Unix-like OS for Cromemco microcomputers with Z80A and/or 68000 CPU

Data General
 AOS for 16-bit Data General Eclipse computers and AOS/VS for 32-bit (MV series) Eclipses, MP/AOS for microNOVA-based computers
 DG/UX
 RDOS Real-time Disk Operating System, with variants: RTOS and DOS (not related to PC DOS, MS-DOS etc.)

Datapoint
 CTOS Cassette Tape Operating System for the Datapoint 2200
 DOS Disk Operating System for the Datapoint 2200, 5500, and 1100

DDC-I, Inc.
 Deos – Time & Space Partitioned RTOS, Certified to DO-178B, Level A since 1998
 HeartOS – POSIX-based Hard Real-Time Operating System

Digital Research, Inc.
 CP/M
 CP/M CP/M for Intel 8080/8085 and Zilog Z80
 Personal CP/M, a refinement of CP/M
 CP/M Plus with BDOS 3.0
 CP/M-68K CP/M for Motorola 68000
 CP/M-8000 CP/M for Zilog Z8000
 CP/M-86 CP/M for Intel 8088/8086
 CP/M-86 Plus
 Personal CP/M-86
 MP/M Multi-user version of CP/M-80
 MP/M II
 MP/M-86 Multi-user version of CP/M-86
 MP/M 8-16, a dual-processor variant of MP/M for 8086 and 8080 CPUs.
 Concurrent CP/M, the successor of CP/M-80 and MP/M-80
 Concurrent CP/M-86, the successor of CP/M-86 and MP/M-86
 Concurrent CP/M 8-16, a dual-processor variant of Concurrent CP/M for 8086 and 8080 CPUs.
 Concurrent CP/M-68K, a variant for the 68000
 DOS
 Concurrent DOS, the successor of Concurrent CP/M-86 with PC-MODE
 Concurrent PC DOS, a Concurrent DOS variant for IBM compatible PCs
 Concurrent DOS 8-16, a dual-processor variant of Concurrent DOS for 8086 and 8080 CPUs
 Concurrent DOS 286
 Concurrent DOS XM, a real-mode variant of Concurrent DOS with EEMS support
 Concurrent DOS 386
 Concurrent DOS 386/MGE, a Concurrent DOS 386 variant with advanced graphics terminal capabilities
 Concurrent DOS 68K, a port of Concurrent DOS to Motorola 68000 CPUs with DOS source code portability capabilities
 FlexOS 1.0 – 2.34, a derivative of Concurrent DOS 286
 FlexOS 186, a variant of FlexOS for terminals
 FlexOS 286, a variant of FlexOS for hosts
 Siemens S5-DOS/MT, an industrial control system based on FlexOS
 IBM 4680 OS, a POS operating system based on FlexOS
 IBM 4690 OS, a POS operating system based on FlexOS
 Toshiba 4690 OS, a POS operating system based on IBM 4690 OS and FlexOS
 FlexOS 386, a later variant of FlexOS for hosts
 IBM 4690 OS, a POS operating system based on FlexOS
 Toshiba 4690 OS, a POS operating system based on IBM 4690 OS and FlexOS
 FlexOS 68K, a derivative of Concurrent DOS 68K
 Multiuser DOS, the successor of Concurrent DOS 386
 CCI Multiuser DOS
 Datapac Multiuser DOS
 Datapac System Manager, a derivative of Datapac Multiuser DOS
 IMS Multiuser DOS
 IMS REAL/32, a derivative of Multiuser DOS
 IMS REAL/NG, the successor of REAL/32
 DOS Plus 1.1 – 2.1, a single-user, multi-tasking system derived from Concurrent DOS 4.1 – 5.0
 DR-DOS 3.31 – 6.0, a single-user, single-tasking native DOS derived from Concurrent DOS 6.0
 Novell PalmDOS 1.0
 Novell "Star Trek"
 Novell DOS 7, a single-user, multi-tasking system derived from DR DOS
 Caldera OpenDOS 7.01
 Caldera DR-DOS 7.02 and higher

Digital Equipment Corporation, Compaq, Hewlett-Packard, Hewlett Packard Enterprise
 Batch-11/DOS-11
 OS/8
 RSTS/E – multi-user time-sharing OS for PDP-11s
 RSX-11 – multiuser, multitasking OS for PDP-11s
 RT-11 – single user OS for PDP-11
 TOPS-10 – for the PDP-10
 TENEX – an ancestor of TOPS-20 from BBN, for the PDP-10
 TOPS-20 – for the PDP-10
 DEC MICA – for the DEC PRISM
 Digital UNIX – derived from OSF/1, became HP's Tru64 UNIX
 Ultrix
 VMS – originally by DEC (now by VMS Software Inc.) for the VAX mini-computer range; later renamed OpenVMS and ported to Alpha, and subsequently ported to Intel Itanium and then to x86-64
 WAITS – for the PDP-6 and PDP-10

ENEA AB
 OSE – Flexible, small footprint, high-performance RTOS for control processors

Fujitsu
 Towns OS
 XSP
 OS/IV
 MSP
 MSP-EX

General Electric, Honeywell, Bull
 Real-Time Multiprogramming Operating System
 GCOS
 Multics

Google

 ChromiumOS is an open source operating system development version of ChromeOS. Both operating systems are based on the Linux kernel.
 ChromeOS is designed to work exclusively with web applications, though has been updated to run Android apps with full support for Google Play Store. Announced on July 7, 2009, ChromeOS is currently publicly available and was released summer 2011. The ChromeOS source code was released on November 19, 2009, under the BSD license as ChromiumOS.
 Container-Optimized OS (COS) is an operating system that is optimized for running Docker containers, based on ChromiumOS.
 Android is an operating system for mobile devices. It consists of Android Runtime (userland) with Linux (kernel), with its Linux kernel modified to add drivers for mobile device hardware and to remove unused Vanilla Linux drivers.
 gLinux, a Linux distribution that Google uses internally
 Fuchsia is a capability-based, real-time, operating system (RTOS) scalable to universal devices, in early development, from the tiniest embedded hardware, wristwatches, tablets to the largest personal computers. Unlike ChromeOS and Android, it is not based on the Linux kernel, but instead began on a new microkernel called "Zircon", derived from "Little Kernel".
 Wear OS a version of Google's Android operating system designed for smartwatches and other wearables.

Green Hills Software
 INTEGRITY – Reliable Operating system
 INTEGRITY-178B – A DO-178B certified version of INTEGRITY.
 µ-velOSity – A lightweight microkernel.

Harris Computer Systems 
 Vulcan O/S – Proprietary O/S for Harris Computer Systems (HCX)
 CX/UX – Proprietary UNIX based OS for Harris' computers (MCX)

Heathkit, Zenith Data Systems
 HDOS – ran on the H8 and Heath/Zenith Z-89 series
 HT-11 – a modified version of RT-11 that ran on the Heathkit H11

Hewlett-Packard, Hewlett Packard Enterprise
 HP Multi-Programming Executive (MPE, MPE/XL, and MPE/iX) – runs on HP 3000 and HP e3000 mini-computers
 HP-UX – runs on HP9000 and Itanium servers (from small to mainframe-class computers)

Honeywell
 CP-6

Huawei
 HarmonyOS
 LiteOS
 EulerOS

Intel Corporation
 iRMX – real-time operating system originally created to support the Intel 8080 and 8086 processor families in embedded applications.
 ISIS, ISIS-II – "Intel Systems Implementation Supervisor" was an environment for development of software within the Intel microprocessor family in the early 1980s on their Intellec Microcomputer Development System and clones. ISIS-II worked with 8 inch floppy disks and had an editor, cross-assemblers, a linker, an object locator, debugger, compilers for PL/M, a BASIC interpreter, etc. and allowed file management through a console.
 iMAX 432 - operating system for systems based on Intel's iAPX 432 architecture.

IBM

On early mainframes: 1410, 7010, 704, 709, 7090, 7094, 7040, 7044, 7030
 BESYS – for the IBM 7090
 Compatible Time-Sharing System (CTSS) – developed at MIT's Computation Center for use on a modified IBM 7094
 FORTRAN Monitor System (FMS) – for the IBM 709 and 7090
 GM OS & GM-NAA I/O – for the IBM 704
 IBSYS – tape based operating system for IBM 7090 and IBM 7094
 7040/7044 Operating System (16/32K) - 7040-PR-150
 IJMON – A bootable serial I/O monitor for loading programs for the IBM 1400 series
 1410 Processor Operating System (PR-155) for the 1410 and 7010
 SHARE Operating System (SOS) – for the IBM 704 and 709
 University of Michigan Executive System (UMES) – for the IBM 704, 709, and 7090)

On S/360, S/370, and successor mainframes
 OS/360 and successors on IBM S/360, S/370, and successor mainframes
 OS/360 (first official OS targeted for the System/360 architecture)
 PCP (Primary Control Program, a kernel and a ground breaking automatic space allocating file system)
 MFT (original Multi-programming with a Fixed number of Tasks, replaced by MFT II)
 MFT II (Multi-Programming with a Fixed number of Tasks, had up to 15 fixed size application partitions, plus partitions for system tasks, initially defined at boot time but redefinable by operator command)
 MVT (Multi-Programming with a Variable number of Tasks, had up to 15 application regions defined dynamically, plus additional regions for system tasks)
 M65MP (MVT with support for a multiprocessor 360/65)
 OS/VS (port of OS/360 targeted for the System/370 virtual memory architecture (OS/370 is not the correct name for OS/VS1 and OS/VS2.) OS/VS has the following variations:
 OS/VS1 (Operating System/Virtual Storage 1, Virtual-memory version of OS/360 MFT II)
 OS/VS1 Basic Programming Extensions (BPE) adds device support and VM handshaking
 OS/VS2 (Operating System/Virtual Storage 2, Virtual-memory version of OS/360 MVT)
OS/VS2 R1 (Called Single Virtual Storage (SVS), Virtual-memory version of OS/360 MVT but without multiprocessing support)
 OS/VS2 R2 through R3.8 (called Multiple Virtual Storage, MVS, eliminated most need for VS1).
 MVS/SE (MVS System Extensions)
 MVS/SP (MVS System Product) V1
MVS/370 refers to OS/VS2 MVS, MVS/SE and MVS/SP Version 1
 MVS/XA (MVS/SP V2, supports S/370 Extended Architecture, 31-bit addressing)
 MVS/ESA (MVS supported Enterprise Systems Architecture, horizontal addressing extensions: data only address spaces called Dataspaces)
 MVS/SP V3
 MVS/ESA SP V4 (a Unix environment was available for MVS/ESA SP V4R3)
 MVS/ESA SP V5 (the UNIX environment was bundled in this and all subsequent versions)
 OS/390 replacement for MVS/ESA SP V5 with some products bundled
 z/OS z/Architecture replacement for OS/390 with 64-bit virtual addressing
 Phoenix/MVS (Developed at Cambridge University)
 DOS/360 and successors on IBM S/360, S/370, and successor mainframes
 BOS/360 (early interim version of DOS/360, briefly available at a few Alpha & Beta System/360 sites)
 TOS/360 (similar to BOS above and more fleeting, able to boot and run from 2x00 series tape drives)
 DOS/360 (Disk Operating System (DOS), multi-programming system with up to 3 partitions, first commonly available OS for System/360)
 DOS/360/RJE (DOS/360 with a control program extension that provided for the monitoring of remote job entry hardware (card reader & printer) connected by dedicated phone lines)
 DOS/VS (First DOS offered on System/370 systems, provided virtual storage)
 DOS/VSE (also known as VSE, upgrade of DOS/VS, up to 14 fixed size processing partitions )
 VSE/Advanced Functions (VSE/AF) - Additional functionality for DOS/VSE
 VSE/SP (program product including DOS/VSE and VSE/AF)
 VSE/ESA, replaces VSE/SP, supports ESA/370 and ESA/390 with 31-bit addresses
 z/VSE  (latest version of the four decades old DOS lineage, supports 64-bit addresses, multiprocessing, multiprogramming, SNA, TCP/IP, and some virtual machine features in support of Linux workloads)
 CP/CMS (Control Program/Cambridge Monitor System) and successors on IBM S/360, S/370, and successor mainframes
 CP-40/CMS (for System/360 Model 40)
 CP-67/CMS (for System/360 Model 67)
 Virtual Machine Facility/370 (VM/370) - the CP virtual machine hypervisor, Conversational Monitor System (CMS) operating system and supporting facilities for System/370 (24-bit addresses)
 VM/370 Basic System Extensions Program Product (VM/BSE, AKA BSEPP) is an enhancement to VM/370
 VM/370 System Extensions Program Product (VM/SE, AKA SEPP) is an enhancement to VM/370 that includes the facilities of VM/BSE
 Virtual Machine/System Product (VM/SP)  replaces VM/370, VM/BSE and VM/SE.
 Virtual Machine/Extended Architecture (VM/XA) refers to three versions of VM that support System/370 Extended Architecture (S/370-XA) with 31-bit virtual addresses
 Virtual Machine/Extended architecture Migration Aid (VM/XA MA) - Intended for MVS/370 to MVS/XA migration
 Virtual Machine/Extended Architecture Systems Facility (VM/XA SF) - new release of VM/XA MA with additional functionality
 Virtual Machine/Extended Architecture System Product (VM/XA SP) - Replaces VM/SP, VM/SP HPO and VM/XA SF
 VM/ESA (Virtual Machine/Enterprise Systems Architecture, supports S/370, ESA/370 and ESA/390)
 z/VM (z/Architecture version of the VM OS with 64-bit addressing)

 TPF Line (Transaction Processing Facility) on IBM S/360, S/370, and successor mainframes (largely used by airlines)
 ACP (Airline Control Program)
 TPF (Transaction Processing Facility)
 z/TPF (z/Architecture extension)
 Unix-like on IBM S/360, S/370, and successor mainframes
 AIX/370 (IBM's Advanced Interactive eXecutive, a System V Unix version)
 AIX/ESA (IBM's Advanced Interactive eXecutive, a System V Unix version)
 OpenSolaris for System z
 UTS (developed by Amdahl)
 Linux on IBM Z
 Others on IBM S/360, S/370, and successor mainframes:
 BOS/360 (Basic Operating System)
 Distributed Processing Programming Executive/370 (DPPX/370) a port of DDPX from 8100 to S/370.
 MTS (Michigan Terminal System, developed by a group of universities in the US, Canada, and the UK for the IBM System/360 Model 67, System/370 series, and compatible mainframes)
 RTOS/360 (IBM's Real Time Operating System, ran on 5 NASA custom System/360-75s)
 TOS/360 (Tape Operating System)
 TSS/360 (IBM's Time Sharing System)
 MUSIC/SP (developed by McGill University for IBM System/370)
 ORVYL and WYLBUR (developed by Stanford University for IBM System/360)

On PC and Intel x86 based architectures
 PC DOS, IBM DOS
 PC DOS 1.x, 2.x, 3.x (developed jointly with Microsoft)
 IBM DOS 4.x, 5.0 (developed jointly with Microsoft)
 PC DOS 6.1, 6.3, 7, 2000, 7.10

 OS/2
 OS/2 1.x (developed jointly with Microsoft)
 OS/2 2.x
 OS/2 Warp 3 (ported to PPC via Workplace OS)
 OS/2 Warp 4
 eComStation (Warp 4.5/Workspace on Demand, rebundled by Serenity Systems International)
 ArcaOS (Warp 4.52 based system sold by Arca Noae, LLC)
 IBM 4680 OS version 1 to 4, a POS operating system based on Digital Research's Concurrent DOS 286 and FlexOS 286 1.xx
 IBM 4690 OS version 1 to 6.3, a successor to 4680 OS based on Novell's FlexOS 286/FlexOS 386 2.3x
 Toshiba 4690 OS version 6.4, a successor to 4690 OS 6.3
 Unix-like on PS/2
 AIX (IBM's Advanced Interactive eXecutive, a System V Unix version)

On other hardware platforms
 IBM Series/1
 EDX (Event Driven Executive)
 RPS (Realtime Programming System)
 CPS (Control Programming Support, subset of RPS)
 SerIX (Unix on Series/1)
 IBM 1130
 DMS (Disk Monitor System)
 IBM 1800
 TSX (Time Sharing eXecutive)
 MPX (Multi Programming eXecutive)
 IBM 8100
 DPCX (Distributed Processing Control eXecutive)
 DPPX (Distributed Processing Programming Executive)
 IBM System/3
 DMS (Disk Management System)
 IBM System/34, IBM System/36
 SSP (System Support Program)
 IBM System/38
 CPF (Control Program Facility)
 IBM System/88
 Stratus VOS (developed by Stratus, and used for IBM System/88, Original equipment manufacturer from Stratus)
 IBM AS/400, iSeries, System i, IBM Power Systems
 IBM i (previously known as OS/400 and i5/OS, descendant of System/38 CPF, includes System/36 SSP and AIX environment)
 UNIX on IBM RT PC
 AOS (a BSD Unix version, not related to Data General AOS)
 AIX (Advanced Interactive eXecutive, a System V Unix version)
 UNIX on POWER ISA, PowerPC, and Power ISA
 AIX (Advanced Interactive eXecutive, a System V Unix version)
 Others
 Workplace OS (a microkernel based operating system including OS/2, developed and canceled in the 1990s)
 K42 (open-source research operating system on PowerPC or x86 based cache-coherent multiprocessor systems)
 Dynix (developed by Sequent, and used for IBM NUMA-Q too)

International Computers Limited
 J and MultiJob – for the System 4 series mainframes
 GEORGE 2/3/4 GEneral ORGanisational Environment – used by ICL 1900 series mainframes
 Executive – used on the 1900 and 290x range of minicomputers. A modified version of Executive was also used as part of GEORGE 3 and 4.
 TME – used on the ME29 minicomputer
 ICL VME – including early variants VME/B and VME/2900, appearing on the ICL 2900 Series and Series 39 mainframes, implemented in S3
 VME/K – on early smaller 2900s

Jide
 Remix OS

Jolla
 Sailfish OS

KaiOS
 KaiOS

Lynx Real-time Systems, LynuxWorks, Lynx Software Technologies
 LynxOS

Meizu
 Flyme OS

Microsoft Corporation
 Xenix (licensed version of Unix; licensed to SCO in 1987)
 MS-DOS (developed jointly with IBM, versions 1.0–6.22)
 Z-DOS
 MS-Net
 MS-DOS 4.0 (multitasking)
 MS-DOS 7
 MSX-DOS (developed by MS Japan for the MSX 8-bit computer)
 DOS/V
 OS/2 1.x (developed jointly with IBM until version 1.3)
 LAN Manager
 Windows (16-bit and 32-bit preemptive and cooperative multitasking, running atop MS-DOS)
 Windows 1.0 (Windows 1)
 Windows 2.0 (Windows 2 – separate version for i386 processor)
 Windows 3.0 (Windows 3)
 Windows 3.1x (Windows 3.1)
 Windows for Workgroups 3.1 (Codename Snowball)
 Windows 3.2 (Chinese-only release)
 Windows for Workgroups 3.11
 Windows 95 (codename Chicago – Windows 4.0)
 Windows 98 (codename Memphis – Windows 4.1)
 Windows Millennium Edition (Windows ME – Windows 4.9)
 Windows NT (Full 32-bit or 64-bit kernel, not dependent on MS-DOS)
 Windows NT 3.1
 Windows NT 3.5
 Windows NT 3.51
 Windows NT 4.0
 Windows 2000 (Windows NT 5.0)
 Windows XP (Windows NT 5.1)
 Windows Server 2003 (Windows NT 5.2)
 Windows Fundamentals for Legacy PCs (based on Windows XP)
 Windows Vista (Windows NT 6.0)
 Windows Azure (Cloud OS Platform) 2009
 Windows Home Server (based on Windows Server 2003)
 Windows Server 2008 (based on Windows Vista)
 Windows 7 (Windows NT 6.1)
 Windows Server 2008 R2 (based on Windows 7)
 Windows Home Server 2011 (based on Windows Server 2008 R2)
 Windows 8 (Windows NT 6.2)
 Windows RT
 Windows Phone 8
 Windows Server 2012 (based on Windows 8)
 Windows 8.1 (Windows NT 6.3)
 Windows Phone 8.1
 Windows Server 2012 R2 (based on Windows 8.1)
 Windows 10 (Windows NT 10.0)
 Windows 10 Mobile
 Windows Server 2016
 Windows Server 2019
 Windows 11 (Windows NT 10.0)
 Windows Server 2022
 Windows CE (OS for handhelds, embedded devices, and real-time applications that is similar to other versions of Windows)
 Windows CE 3.0
 Windows CE 5.0
 Windows Embedded CE 6.0
 Windows Embedded Compact 7
 Windows Embedded Compact 2013
 Windows Mobile (based on Windows CE, but for a smaller form factor)
 Windows Phone 7
 KIN OS
 Xbox system software
 Xbox (first generation) system software
 Xbox 360 system software
 Xbox One system software
 Xbox Series X/S system software
 Singularity – A research operating system written mostly in managed code (C#)
 Midori – A managed code operating system
 SONiC
 Azure Sphere
 CBL-Mariner
 ThreadX

MITS
 Altair DOS – An early disk operating system for the Altair 8800 machine.

MontaVista
 MontaVista Mobilinux

Motorola
 VERSAdos

NCR Corporation
 TMX – Transaction Management eXecutive
 IMOS – Interactive Multiprogramming Operating System (circa 1978), for the NCR Century 8200 series minicomputers
 VRX – Virtual Resource eXecutive

NeXT
 NeXTSTEP

Nintendo
 ES – a computer operating system developed originally by Nintendo and since 2008 by Esrille. It is open source and runs natively on x86 platforms.
 Wii system software
 Wii U system software
 Nintendo Switch system software

Novell
 NetWare – network operating system providing high-performance network services. Has been superseded by Open Enterprise Server line, which can be based on NetWare or Linux to provide the same set of services.
 UnixWare
 Novell "SuperNOS" – a never released merge of NetWare and UnixWare
 Novell "Corsair"
 Novell "Exposé"
 Open Enterprise Server – the successor to NetWare

Open Mobile Platform
 Aurora OS – the successor to Sailfish OS (not to be confused with a different Aurora OS)

Quadros Systems
 RTXC Quadros RTOS – proprietary C-based RTOS used in embedded systems

RCA
 Time Sharing Operating System (TSOS) – first OS supporting virtual addressing of the main storage and support for both timeshare and batch interface

RoweBots
 DSPnano RTOS – 8/16 Bit Ultra Tiny Embedded Linux Compatible RTOS

Samsung Electronics
 Bada
 Tizen is an operating system based on the Linux kernel, a project within the Linux Foundation and is governed by a Technical Steering Group (TSG) while controlled by Samsung and backed by Intel. Tizen works on a wide range of Samsung devices including smartphones, tablets, smart TVs, PCs and wearable.
 Orsay
 One UI - Android skin

Scientific Data Systems (SDS)
 Berkeley Timesharing System for the SDS 940

SCO, SCO Group
 Xenix, Unix System III based distribution for the Intel 8086/8088 architecture
 Xenix 286, Unix System V Release 2 based distribution for the Intel 80286 architecture
 Xenix 386, Unix System V Release 2 based distribution for the Intel 80386 architecture
 SCO Unix, SCO UNIX System V/386 was the first volume commercial product licensed by AT&T to use the UNIX System trademark (1989). Derived from AT&T System V Release 3.2 with an infusion of Xenix device drivers and utilities plus most of the SVR4 features
 SCO Open Desktop, the first 32-bit graphical user interface for UNIX Systems running on Intel processor-based computers. Based on SCO Unix
 SCO OpenServer 5, AT&T UNIX System V Release 3 based
 SCO OpenServer 6, SVR5 (UnixWare 7) based kernel with SCO OpenServer 5 application and binary compatibility, system administration, and user environments
 UnixWare
 UnixWare 2.x, based on AT&T System V Release 4.2MP
 UnixWare 7, UnixWare 2 kernel plus parts of 3.2v5 (UnixWare 2 + OpenServer 5 = UnixWare 7). Referred to by SCO as SVR5

Silicon Laboratories (formerly Micrium Inc.)
 Micrium OS - customized μC/OS-III for Silicon Laboratories's SoC products

Sinclair Research
 Sinclair BASIC was used in the 8-bit home computers from Sinclair Research and Timex Sinclair. It was included in the ROM, and the computers booted to the Basic interpreter. Various versions exist, with the latter ones supporting disk drive operations.

Sony
 PlayStation 3 system software
 PlayStation 4 system software
 PlayStation 5 system software

SYSGO
 PikeOS – a certified real time operating system for safety and security critical embedded systems

Tandem Computers, Compaq, Hewlett-Packard, Hewlett Packard Enterprise
 NonStop OS – runs on HPE's NonStop line of servers

Tandy Corporation
 TRSDOS – A floppy-disk-oriented OS supplied by Tandy/Radio Shack for their TRS-80 Z80-based line of personal computers. Eventually renamed as LS-DOS or LDOS.
 Color BASIC – A ROM-based OS created by Microsoft for the TRS-80 Color Computer.
 NewDos/80 – A third-party OS for Tandy's TRS-80 personal computers.
 DeskMate – Operating system created by Tandy Corporation and introduced with the Tandy 1000 computer.

TCSC (later NCSC)
 Edos – enhanced version of IBM's DOS/360 (and later DOS/VS and DOS/VSE) operating system for System/360 and System/370 IBM mainframes

Texas Instruments
 TI-RTOS Kernel – Real-time operating system for TI's embedded devices.

TRON Project
 TRON – open real-time operating system kernel
 T-Kernel

UNIVAC, Unisys
 EXEC I
 EXEC II
 EXEC 8/OS 1100/OS 2200
 VS/9, successor to RCA TSOS

Wang Laboratories
 WPS Wang Word Processing System. Micro-code based system.
 OIS Wang Office Information System. Successor to the WPS. Combined the WPS and VP/MVP systems.

Weston Embedded Solutions
 μC/OS-II  – a small pre-emptive priority based multi-tasking kernel
 μC/OS-III – a small pre-emptive priority based multi-tasking kernel, with unlimited number of tasks and priorities, and round-robin scheduling
 Cesium RTOS - commercial continuation of Micrium's μC/OS-III forked from the open-sources release

Wind River Systems
 VxWorks – Small footprint, scalable, high-performance RTOS for embedded microprocessor based systems.

Zilog
 Z80-RIO

Other

Lisp-based
 Lisp Machines, Inc. (also known as LMI) used an operating system written in MIT's Lisp Machine Lisp.
 Symbolics Genera written in a systems dialect of the Lisp programming language called ZetaLisp and Symbolics Common Lisp. Genera was ported to a virtual machine for the DEC Alpha line of computers.
 Texas Instruments' Explorer Lisp machine workstations also had systems code written in Lisp Machine Lisp.
 Xerox 1100 series of Lisp machines used an operating system also written in Interlisp, and was also ported to a virtual machine called "Medley."

For Elektronika BK
 ANDOS
 CSI-DOS
 MK-DOS

Non-standard language-based
 Pilot operating system – written in the Mesa language and used on Xerox Star workstations.
 PERQ Operating System (POS) – written in PERQ Pascal.

Other proprietary non-Unix-like
 Эльбрус-1 (Elbrus-1) and Эльбрус-2 – used for application, job control, system programming,  implemented in uЭль-76 (AL-76).
 EOS – developed by ETA Systems for use in their ETA-10 line of supercomputers
 EMBOS – developed by Elxsi for use on their mini-supercomputers
 GCOS – a proprietary Operating System originally developed by General Electric
 MAI Basic Four – An OS implementing Business Basic from MAI Systems.
 Michigan Terminal System – Developed by a group of universities in the US, Canada, and the UK for use on the IBM System/360 Model 67, the System/370 series, and compatible mainframes
 MUSIC/SP – an operating system developed for the S/370, running normally under VM
 OS ES – an operating system for ES EVM
 PC-MOS/386 – DOS-like, but multiuser/multitasking
 Prolog-Dispatcher – used to control Soviet Buran space shuttle.
 SINTRAN III – an operating system used with Norsk Data computers.
 SkyOS – commercial desktop OS for PCs
 SODA – used by the Odra 1204 computers.
 THEOS
 TSX-32 – a 32-bit operating system for x86 platform.
 TX990/TXDS, DX10 and DNOS – proprietary operating systems for TI-990 minicomputers

Other proprietary Unix-like and POSIX-compliant
 Aegis (Apollo Computer)
 Amiga Unix (Amiga ports of Unix System V release 3.2 with Amiga A2500UX and SVR4 with Amiga A3000UX. Started in 1990, last version was in 1992)
 Coherent (Unix-like OS from Mark Williams Co. for PC class computers)
 DC/OSx (DataCenter/OSx—an operating system developed by Pyramid Technology for its MIPS-based systems)
 DG/UX (Data General Corp)
 DNIX from DIAB
 DSPnano RTOS (POSIX nanokernel, DSP Optimized, Open Source)
 HeliOS developed and sold by Perihelion Software mainly for transputer-based systems
 Interactive Unix (a port of the UNIX System V operating system for Intel x86 by Interactive Systems Corporation)
 IRIX from SGI
 MeikOS
 NeXTSTEP (developed by NeXT; a Unix-based OS based on the Mach microkernel)
 OS-9 Unix-like RTOS. (OS from Microware for Motorola 6809 based microcomputers)
 OS9/68K Unix-like RTOS. (OS from Microware for Motorola 680x0 based microcomputers; based on OS-9)
 OS-9000 Unix-like RTOS. (OS from Microware for Intel x86 based microcomputers; based on OS-9, written in C)
 OSF/1 (developed into a commercial offering by Digital Equipment Corporation)
 OPENSTEP
 QNX (POSIX, microkernel OS; usually a real time embedded OS)
 Rhapsody (an early form of Mac OS X)
 RISC iX – derived from BSD 4.3, by Acorn computers, for their ARM family of machines
 RISC/os (a port by MIPS Technologies of 4.3BSD for its MIPS-based computers)
 RMX
 SCO UNIX (from SCO, bought by Caldera who renamed themselves SCO Group)
 SINIX (a port by SNI of Unix to the MIPS architecture)
 Solaris (from Sun, bought by Oracle; a System V-based replacement for SunOS)
 SunOS (BSD-based Unix system used on early Sun hardware)
 SUPER-UX (a port of System V Release 4.2MP with features adopted from BSD and Linux for NEC SX architecture supercomputers)
 System V (a release of AT&T Unix, 'SVR4' was the 4th minor release)
 System V/AT, 386 (The first version of AT&T System V UNIX on the IBM 286 and 386 PCs, ported and sold by Microport)
 Trusted Solaris (Solaris with kernel and other enhancements to support multilevel security)
 UniFLEX (Unix-like OS from TSC for DMA-capable, extended addresses, Motorola 6809 based computers; e.g. SWTPC, Gimix and others)
 Unicos (the version of Unix designed for Cray Supercomputers, mainly geared to vector calculations)
 UTX-32 (Developed by Gould CSD (Computer System Division), a Unix-based OS that included both BSD and System V characteristics. It was one of the first Unix based systems to receive NSA's C2 security level certification.)
 Zenix, Zenith corporations Unix (a popular USA electronics maker at the time)

Non-proprietary

Unix or Unix-like
 MINIX (study OS developed by Andrew S. Tanenbaum in the Netherlands)
 BSD (Berkeley Software Distribution, a variant of Unix for DEC VAX hardware)
 FreeBSD (one of the outgrowths of UC Regents' abandonment of CSRG's 'BSD Unix')
 DragonFlyBSD, forked from FreeBSD 4.8
 MidnightBSD, forked from FreeBSD 6.1
 GhostBSD
 TrueOS (previously known as PC-BSD), made for desktop/laptop usage, now discontinued
 NomadBSD, a German project aiming to tend FreeBSD to desktop/laptop needs
 NetBSD (an embedded device BSD variant)
 OpenBSD forked from NetBSD
 Bitrig forked from OpenBSD, discontinued
 Fugulta, an OpenBSD desktop fork by Japanese developers
 Darwin, created by Apple using code from NeXTSTEP, FreeBSD, and NetBSD
 GNU (also known as GNU/Hurd)
 Linux (see also List of Linux distributions) (alleged to be GNU/Linux see GNU/Linux naming controversy)
 Android
 Android-x86
 Remix OS
 EulerOS - Linux commercial distribution for cloud based software by Huawei
 Redox (written in Rust)
 OpenSolaris
 illumos, contains original Unix (SVR4) code derived from the OpenSolaris (discontinued by Oracle in favor of Solaris 11 Express)
 OpenIndiana, operates under the illumos Foundation. Uses the illumos kernel, which is a derivative of OS/Net, which is basically an OpenSolaris/Solaris kernel with the bulk of the drivers, core libraries, and basic utilities.
 Nexenta OS, based on the illumos kernel with Ubuntu packages
 SmartOS, an illumos distribution for cloud computing with Kernel-based Virtual Machine integration.
 RTEMS (Real-Time Executive for Multiprocessor Systems)
 Syllable Desktop
 VSTa
 Plurix (or Tropix) (by Federal University of Rio de Janeiro – UFRJ)
 TUNIS (University of Toronto)
Xv6 - a simple Unix-like teaching operating system from MIT
SerenityOS - aims to be a modern Unix-like operating system, yet with a look and feel that emulates 1990s operating systems such as Microsoft Windows and the classic Mac OS.
LiteOS
OpenHarmony

Non-Unix
 Cosmos – written in C#
 EmuTOS - open source Atari TOS variant
 FreeDOS – open source MS-DOS variant
 Genode – operating system framework for microkernels (written in C++)
 Ghost OS – written in assembly, C/C++
 Haiku – open source inspired by BeOS, in development
 Incompatible Timesharing System (ITS) – written in the MIDAS macro assembler language for the PDP-6 and PDP-10 by MIT students
 MagiC - open source Atari TOS variant
 osFree – OS/2 Warp open source clone
 OSv – written in C++
 Phantom OS – persistent object-oriented
 ReactOS – open source OS designed to be binary compatible with Windows NT and its variants (Windows XP, Windows 2000, etc.); in development
 SharpOS – written in .NET C#
 TempleOS – written in HolyC
 Visopsys – written in C and assembly by Andy McLaughlin

Research

Unix or Unix-like
 Plan 9 from Bell Labs – distributed OS developed at Bell Labs, based on original Unix design principles yet functionally different and going much further
 Inferno – distributed OS derived from Plan 9, originally from Bell Labs
 9front, a derivative open-source project made to resurrect Plan 9 to passionate developers
 Research Unix

Non-Unix
 Amoeba – research OS by Andrew S. Tanenbaum
 Barrelfish
 Croquet
 EROS – microkernel, capability-based
 CapROS – microkernel EROS successor
 Harmony – realtime, multitasking, multiprocessing message-passing system developed at the National Research Council of Canada.
 HelenOS – research and experimental operating system
 House – Haskell User's Operating System and Environment, research OS written in Haskell and C
 ILIOS – Research OS designed for routing
 L4 – second generation microkernel
 Mach – from OS kernel research at Carnegie Mellon University; see NeXTSTEP
 Nemesis – Cambridge University research OS – detailed quality of service abilities
 Singularity – experimental OS from Microsoft Research written in managed code to be highly dependable
 Spring – research OS from Sun Microsystems
 THE multiprogramming system – by Dijkstra in 1968, at the Eindhoven University of Technology in the Netherlands, introduced the first form of software-based memory segmentation, freeing programmers from being forced to use actual physical locations
 Thoth – realtime, multiprocess message-passing system developed at the University of Waterloo.
 V – from Stanford, early 1980s
 Verve – OS designed by Microsoft Research to be verified end-to-end for type safety and memory safety
 Xinu – Study OS developed by Douglas E. Comer in the United States

Disk operating systems (DOS)

 86-DOS (developed at Seattle Computer Products by Tim Paterson for the new Intel 808x CPUs; licensed to Microsoft, became PC DOS/MS-DOS. Also known by its working title QDOS.)
 PC DOS (IBM's DOS variant, developed jointly with Microsoft, versions 1.0–7.0, 2000, 7.10)
 MS-DOS (Microsoft's DOS variant for OEM, developed jointly with IBM, versions 1.x–6.22 Microsoft's now abandoned DOS variant)
 Concurrent CP/M-86 3.1 (BDOS 3.1) with PC-MODE (Digital Research's successor of CP/M-86 and MP/M-86)
 Concurrent DOS 3.1-4.1 (BDOS 3.1-4.1)
 Concurrent PC DOS 3.2 (BDOS 3.2) (Concurrent DOS variant for IBM compatible PCs)
 DOS Plus 1.1, 1.2 (BDOS 4.1), 2.1 (BDOS 5.0) (single-user, multi-tasking system derived from Concurrent DOS 4.1-5.0)
 Concurrent DOS 8-16 (dual-processor variant of Concurrent DOS for 8086 and 8080 CPUs)
 Concurrent DOS 286 1.x
 FlexOS 1.00-2.34 (derivative of Concurrent DOS 286)
 FlexOS 186 (variant of FlexOS for terminals)
 FlexOS 286 (variant of FlexOS for hosts)
 Siemens S5-DOS/MT (industrial control system based on FlexOS)
 IBM 4680 OS (POS operating system based on FlexOS)
 IBM 4690 OS (POS operating system based on FlexOS)
 Toshiba 4690 OS (POS operating system based on IBM 4690 OS and FlexOS)
 FlexOS 386 (later variant of FlexOS for hosts)
 IBM 4690 OS (POS operating system based on FlexOS)
 Toshiba 4690 OS (POS operating system based on IBM 4690 OS and FlexOS)
 Concurrent DOS 386 1.0, 1.1, 2.0, 3.0 (BDOS 5.0-6.2)
 Concurrent DOS 386/MGE (Concurrent DOS 386 variant with advanced graphics terminal capabilities)
 Multiuser DOS 5.0, 5.01, 5.1 (BDOS 6.3-6.6) (successor of Concurrent DOS 386)
 CCI Multiuser DOS 5.0-7.22 (up to BDOS 6.6)
 Datapac Multiuser DOS
 Datapac System Manager 7 (derivative of Datapac Multiuser DOS)
 IMS Multiuser DOS 5.1, 7.0, 7.1 (BDOS 6.6-6.7)
 IMS REAL/32 7.50, 7.51, 7.52, 7.53, 7.54, 7.60, 7.61, 7.62, 7.63, 7.70, 7.71, 7.72, 7.73, 7.74, 7.80, 7.81, 7.82, 7.83, 7.90, 7.91, 7.92, 7.93, 7.94, 7.95 (BDOS 6.8 and higher) (derivative of Multiuser DOS)
 IMS REAL/NG (successor of REAL/32)
 Concurrent DOS XM 5.0, 5.2, 6.0, 6.2 (BDOS 5.0-6.2) (real-mode variant of Concurrent DOS with EEMS support)
 DR DOS 3.31, 3.32, 3.33, 3.34, 3.35, 5.0, 6.0 (BDOS 6.0-7.1) single-user, single-tasking native DOS derived from Concurrent DOS 6.0)
 Novell PalmDOS 1 (BDOS 7.0)
 Novell DR DOS "StarTrek"
 Novell DOS 7 (single-user, multi-tasking system derived from DR DOS, BDOS 7.2)
 Novell DOS 7 updates 1-10 (BDOS 7.2)
 Caldera OpenDOS 7.01 (BDOS 7.2)
 Enhanced DR-DOS 7.01.0x (BDOS 7.2)
 Dell Real Mode Kernel (DRMK)
 Novell DOS 7 updates 11-15.2 (BDOS 7.2)
 Caldera DR-DOS 7.02-7.03 (BDOS 7.3)
 DR-DOS "WinBolt"
 OEM DR-DOS 7.04-7.05 (BDOS 7.3)
 OEM DR-DOS 7.06 (PQDOS)
 OEM DR-DOS 7.07 (BDOS 7.4/7.7)
 FreeDOS (open source DOS variant)
 ProDOS (operating system for the Apple II series computers)
 PTS-DOS (DOS variant by Russian company Phystechsoft)
 TurboDOS (Software 2000, Inc.) for Z80 and Intel 8086 processor-based systems
 Multi-tasking user interfaces and environments for DOS
 DESQview + QEMM 386 multi-tasking user interface for DOS
 DESQView/X (X-windowing GUI for DOS)

Network operating systems

 Banyan VINES – by Banyan Systems
 Cambridge Ring
 Cisco IOS – by Cisco Systems
 Cisco NX-OS – previously SAN-OS
 CTOS – by Convergent Technologies, later acquired by Unisys
 Data ONTAP – by NetApp
 ExtremeWare – by Extreme Networks
 ExtremeXOS – by Extreme Networks
 Fabric OS – by Brocade
 JunOS – by Juniper
 NetWare – networking OS by Novell
 Network operating system (NOS) – developed by CDC for use in their Cyber line of supercomputers
 Novell Open Enterprise Server – Open Source networking OS by Novell. Can incorporate either SUSE Linux or Novell NetWare as its kernel
 Plan 9 – distributed OS developed at Bell Labs, based on Unix design principles but not functionally identical
 Inferno – distributed OS derived from Plan 9, originally from Bell Labs
 SONiC
 TurboDOS – by Software 2000, Inc.

Generic, commodity, and other
 BLIS/COBOL
 A2 formerly named Active Object System (AOS), and then Bluebottle (a concurrent and active object update to the Oberon operating system)
 BS1000 by Siemens
 BS2000 by Siemens, now BS2000/OSD from Fujitsu Siemens (formerly Siemens Nixdorf Informationssysteme)
 BS3000 by Siemens (rebadging of Fujitsu's MSP operating system)
 Contiki for various, mostly 8-bit systems, including the Apple II series, the Atari 8-bit family, and some Commodore machines.
 FLEX9 (by Technical Systems Consultants (TSC) for Motorola 6809 based machines; successor to FLEX, which was for Motorola 6800 CPUs)
 Graphics Environment Manager (GEM) (windowing GUI for CP/M, DOS, and Atari TOS)
 GEOS (popular windowing GUI for PC, Commodore, Apple computers)
 JavaOS
 JNode (Java New Operating System Design Effort), written 99% in Java (native compiled), provides own JVM and JIT compiler. Based on GNU Classpath.
 JX Java operating system that focuses on a flexible and robust operating system architecture developed as an open source system by the University of Erlangen.
 KERNAL (default OS on Commodore 64)
 MERLIN for the Corvus Concept
 MorphOS (Amiga compatible)
 MSP by Fujitsu (successor to OS-IV), now MSP/EX, also known as Extended System Architecture (EXA), for 31-bit mode
 NetWare (networking OS by Novell)
 Oberon (operating system) (developed at ETH-Zürich by Niklaus Wirth et al.) for the Ceres and Chameleon workstation projects
 OSD/XC by Fujitsu-Siemens (BS2000 ported to an emulation on a Sun SPARC platform)
 OS-IV by Fujitsu (based on early versions of IBM's MVS)
 Pick (often licensed and renamed)
 PRIMOS by Prime Computer (sometimes spelled PR1MOS and PR1ME)
 Sinclair QDOS (multitasking for the Sinclair QL computer)
 SSB-DOS (by Technical Systems Consultants (TSC) for Smoke Signal Broadcasting; a variant of FLEX in most respects)
 SymbOS (GUI based multitasking operating system for Z80 computers)
 Symobi (GUI based modern micro-kernel OS for x86, ARM and PowerPC processors, developed by Miray Software; used and developed further at Technical University of Munich)
 TripOS, 1978
 TurboDOS (Software 2000, Inc.)
 UCSD p-System (portable complete programming environment/operating system/virtual machine developed by a long running student project at UCSD; directed by Prof Kenneth Bowles; written in Pascal)
 VOS by Stratus Technologies with strong influence from Multics
 VOS3 by Hitachi for its IBM-compatible mainframes, based on IBM's MVS
 VM2000 by Siemens
 Visi On (first GUI for early PC machines; not commercially successful)
 VPS/VM (IBM based, main operating system at Boston University for over 10 years.)

Hobby

 AROS – AROS Research Operating System (formerly known as Amiga Research Operating System)
 AtheOS – branched to become Syllable Desktop
 Syllable Desktop – a modern, independently originated OS; see AtheOS
 BareMetal
 DSPnano RTOS
 EmuTOS
 EROS – Extremely Reliable Operating System
 HelenOS – based on a preemptible microkernel design
 LSE/OS
 MenuetOS – extremely compact OS with GUI, written entirely in FASM assembly language
 KolibriOS – a fork of MenuetOS
 MMURTL (Message based MUltitasking Real-Time kerneL, pronounced 'Myrtle')
 SerenityOS
 SerpaeOS
 ToaruOS
 PonyOS

Embedded

Mobile operating systems

 DIP DOS on Atari Portfolio
 Embedded Linux (see also Linux for mobile devices)
 Android
 CalyxOS
 DivestOS
 EMUI
 Flyme OS
 GrapheneOS
 LineageOS
 MIUI
 Replicant
 See also List of custom Android distributions
 Firefox OS
 KaiOS
 Ångström distribution
 Familiar Linux
 Mæmo based on Debian deployed on Nokia's Nokia 770, N800 and N810 Internet Tablets.
 OpenZaurus
 webOS from Palm, Inc., later Hewlett-Packard via acquisition, and most recently at LG Electronics through acquisition from Hewlett-Packard
 Access Linux Platform
 bada
 Openmoko Linux
 OPhone
 MeeGo (from merger of Maemo & Moblin)
 Mobilinux
 MotoMagx
 Qt Extended
 Sailfish OS
 Tizen (earlier called LiMo Platform)
 Ubuntu Touch
 PostmarketOS
 Inferno (distributed OS originally from Bell Labs)
 Magic Cap
 MS-DOS on Poqet PC, HP 95LX, HP 100LX, HP 200LX, HP 1000CX, HP OmniGo 700LX
 NetBSD
 Newton OS on Apple MessagePad
 Palm OS from Palm, Inc; now spun off as PalmSource
 PEN/GEOS on HP OmniGo 100 and 120
 PenPoint OS
 Plan 9 from Bell Labs
 PVOS
 Symbian OS
 EPOC
 Windows CE, from Microsoft
 Pocket PC from Microsoft, a variant of Windows CE
 Windows Mobile from Microsoft, a variant of Windows CE
 Windows Phone from Microsoft
 DSPnano RTOS
 iOS
 watchOS
 tvOS
 iPod software
 iPodLinux
 iriver clix OS
 RockBox
 BlackBerry OS
 PEN/GEOS, GEOS-SC, GEOS-SE
 Palm OS
 Symbian platform (successor to Symbian OS)
 BlackBerry 10
 HarmonyOS

Routers
 CatOS – by Cisco Systems
 Cisco IOS – originally Internetwork Operating System by Cisco Systems
 DNOS – by DriveNets
 Inferno – distributed OS originally from Bell Labs
 IOS-XR – by Cisco Systems
 JunOS – by Juniper Networks
 LCOS – by LANCOM Systems
 Linux
 OpenWrt
 DD-WRT
 LEDE
 Gargoyle
 LibreCMC
 Zeroshell
 FTOS – by Force10 Networks
 FreeBSD
 m0n0wall
 OPNsense
 pfsense
 List of wireless router firmware projects

Other embedded
 Apache Mynewt
 ChibiOS/RT
 Contiki
 ERIKA Enterprise
 eCos
 NetBSD
 Nucleus RTOS
 NuttX
 Minix
 NCOS
 freeRTOS, openRTOS, safeRTOS
 Fuchsia
 OpenEmbedded (or Yocto Project)
 OpenHarmony
 pSOS (Portable Software On Silicon)
 QNX – Unix-like real-time operating system, aimed primarily at the embedded systems market.
 REX OS – microkernel; usually an embedded cell phone OS
 RIOT
 ROM-DOS
 TinyOS
 ThreadX
 RT-Thread
 DSPnano RTOS
 Windows IoT – formerly Windows Embedded
 Windows CE
 Windows IoT Core
 Windows IoT Enterprise
 Wind River VxWorks RTOS.
 Wombat – microkernel; usually real-time embedded
 Zephyr

LEGO Mindstorms
 brickOS
 leJOS

Capability-based
 Cambridge CAP computer – operating system demonstrated the use of security capabilities, both in hardware and software, also a useful fileserver, implemented in ALGOL 68C
 Flex machine – Custom microprogrammable hardware, with an operating system, (modular) compiler, editor, * garbage collector and filing system all written in ALGOL 68.
 HYDRA – Running on the C.mmp computer at Carnegie Mellon University, implemented in the programming language BLISS
 KeyKOS nanokernel
 EROS microkernel
 CapROS EROS successor
 V – from Stanford, early 1980s

See also
 Comparison of operating systems
 Comparison of real-time operating systems
 Timeline of operating systems

Category links
 Operating systems
 Embedded operating systems
 Real-time operating systems

References

External links
 "List of Operating Systems". www.operating-system.org.

List of operating systems
Computing-related lists
Operating